List of ships built by Aberdeen shipbuilders Hall, Russell & Company, to yard number 200.

The ships built in the sequence to 200 cover the period 1868 to 1876.

The initial numbering began at 256, which was the numbering sequence used by Alexander Hall and Sons before switching to their own numbering sequence with the Inverness, the third ship built. Hall, Russell and Company initially built boilers and engines for ships, the second numbering sequence may follow on from that.

Notes
 Where available, vessel measurements taken from Lloyd's Register, giving registered length, beam and draft. Hall, Russell and Company's own measurements typically are length overall, beam and moulded depth.

References

Ships built in Scotland